Mount Druitt is a suburb of Sydney, in the state of New South Wales, Australia.

There are numerous encompassing, smaller suburbs nearby including Bidwill, Blackett, Dharruk, Emerton, Hebersham, Lethbridge Park, Minchinbury, Shalvey, Tregear, Whalan, and Willmot.

History
Major George Druitt (1773–1842) was granted  in the area by Governor Macquarie. He named his grant, where he died in 1842, Mount Druitt.

Rail services to Mount Druitt commenced on 19 August 1881. The railway station operated as the post office between 1885 and 1918. The station had two platforms and a level crossing at the western end and included small goods yard, servicing a small mill. A railway gatekeeper's lodge was built circa 1867, and was later converted to the station master's cottage. It was later sold and converted to commercial use.

Electric train services to Mount Druitt commenced in 1955, at a service presided by then Premier of New South Wales, Joseph Cahill. In 1975, the railway station was relocated approximately 500 metres east to service a new shopping centre that was locally known as "The Great Western" and is now owned by Westfield. The old railway station was demolished almost immediately, although the level crossing remained until a road bridge carrying Carlisle Avenue over the railway line was completed. A footbridge was also built for pedestrians.

Mount Druitt Hospital was opened in 1982 by Queen Elizabeth II. The 200-bed hospital was opened following significant fundraising and political agitation from the local community due to perception that the community was unable to access medical services at either Blacktown or Nepean Hospitals.

In April 2006, the Attorney General's Department of New South Wales opened a new court house at a cost of A$12 million. This was to become the first metropolitan area courthouse to utilize "circle sentencing", with aims to reduce over representation of Indigenous Australians in custody.

A local landmark is the Georgian cottage known as The Manse, situated in The Avenue. It was probably built by John Harris in the mid-1880s; the land on which it was built was originally part of Druitt's property. Later it was sold to Robert Kennedy. Kennedy left it to the Presbyterian Church when he died, and it was used for some time as a manse. It was acquired by Blacktown City Council in 2000 and restored. It is now the headquarters of the Mt Druitt Historical Society and is open to the public. It has both a local government and state government heritage listing.

Incidents 

 25 February 2020: A man was dealt a broken jaw and several stab wounds during a brawl in Mount Druitt.
 14 October 2021: The roof of a Best and Less store in Westfield Mount Druitt collapsed following storms in Sydney.
 12 November 2021: A man was allegedly stabbed in the back in Mount Druitt with public accounts suggesting the man had left a store without paying for items.

Heritage listings 
Mount Druitt has a number of heritage-listed sites, including:
 Great Western Highway: Neoblie
 23 The Avenue: The Manse

Commercial area
The Mount Druitt township was serviced by a relatively small shopping area known as Mount Druitt Village.

In 1975, a new shopping centre, known locally as "The Great Western", was opened approximately 500 metres to the east when the railway station was also relocated and a large bus/rail interchange was built. The Westfield corporation took over the shopping centre, which is now known as Westfield Mount Druitt, located on the corner of Carlisle Avenue and Luxford Road, both major roads in the area. The complex has over 200 stores, ranging from discount department stores to specialty shops. Shopsmart is another shopping centre located in the suburb. Other services such as a hospital, coffee shops, small bars, council-operated swimming pool and library are all located within walking distance of the railway station.

The area is under a Blacktown council redevelopment Plan.

Much of the Housing commission has been sold off to Developers and the area is being revitalized – with Mixed use developments taking place. The area is becoming extremely popular with the Chinese, Thai and Filipino community.  Due to the affordability, excellent schools, parks and transport links.

Transport
Mount Druitt railway station is located on the North Shore & Western Line of the Sydney Trains network. There is an express service which runs all day taking 30 minutes to get to Parramatta and 55 minutes to Sydney. It features an interchange with bus routes operated by Busways with routes to all suburbs in the Mount Druitt area, Blacktown and Glendenning.

The first electric train to Mount Druitt operated 8 October 1955.

The council is embarking on a feasibility to install a new light rail which will link Mount Druitt to the other Blacktown Shire suburbs.

Education
Mount Druitt High school was established in the 1960s. The school is currently located within the suburb of Dharruk, adjacent to the local Emerton Shopping Village. It later rebranded as Chifley College Mount Druitt Campus, educating years 7–10. Chifley College Senior Campus educates the senior classes (years 11–12), and is within walking distance from Mount Druitt Station. 
A number of private schools such as the Church of England Grammar school have acquired parklands in the area.  There are plans to build a 2000 student private school in the area adjacent to Wilmot. This is in partnership with the State Government who are selling off the failed public housing estate in the area.

Colyton Public School, established in 1861, is located in Mount Druitt.

Demographics
According to the 2016 census of population, there were 16,726 people in Mount Druitt.
 The most common ancestries were Australian 11.9%, Filipino 11.9%, English 10.2%, Indian 6.9% and Pakistani 5.5%.
 40.8% of people were born in Australia. The next most common countries of birth were Philippines 11.3%, Pakistan 5.9%, Iraq 4.9%, India 4.2% and Fiji 2.6%.   
 34.4% of people spoke only English at home. Other languages spoken at home included Urdu 8.5%, Arabic 7.6%, Tagalog 7.2%, Chaldean Neo-Aramaic 4.0% and Filipino 3.5%.
 The most common responses for religion were Catholic 31.0%, Islam 22.2% and No Religion 9.3%.
 The most common occupations included Machinery Operators and Drivers 15.6%, Clerical and Administrative Workers 14.7%, Labourers 13.7%, Professionals 13.7%, and Technicians and Trades Workers 12.9%.

Notable residents
 George Donikian, Journalist and newscaster 
 Calum Hood, Musician, bassist of 5 Seconds of Summer
 Josh Lalor, Cricketer
 Beki Lee, Olympic athlete was brought up in Mt Druitt.
 Spencer Leniu, Professional NRL plater
 Jarome Luai, Professional NRL player
 Onefour, Australian drill group 
 Anthony Roberts, The member for North Sydney grew up in the area.
 Brian To'o, Professional NRL player
 Tai Tuivasa, UFC heavyweight fighter

See also
 Mount Druitt Hospital
 Mount Druitt Waterworks
 The Lives of Mount Druitt Youth

References

External links

 Mount Druitt Historical Society

 
Suburbs of Sydney
City of Blacktown